David Spinx (born 25 April 1951) is an English actor, probably best known for playing Keith Miller in the BBC television soap opera EastEnders from 2004–2008. He has previously appeared in EastEnders as a guest character in an episode in 1999 as the cellmate of Steve Owen and provided the voices on the radios in Barry Evans' cab firm. He has made guest appearances in many other television series such as A Touch of Frost, The Bill and Hustle. David made his last appearance on Eastenders on 1 July 2008. His character was axed due to having 'run out of steam'.

Filmography
Casualty (2014)
Snow in Paradise (2014
Come Dine with Me (2010) - Himself
EastEnders (1999) - Sharkey, (2004–2008) - Keith Miller
Hustle (2004) - Security Guard
New Tricks (2003) - File Sergeant
Falling Apart (2002) - Men's Group Member
Tipping the Velvet (2002) - Rough Man
Jack of Diamonds (2001) - Kelly
Conspiracy (TV) (2001) - Cook
Holby City (2000) - Len Palmer
Fifteen to One (2000) - Himself
A Touch of Frost (1999–2000) - Dick Rycroft
The Bill (1999) - Porter, (2003) - Trevor Saunders
Grafters (1998) - Bailiff
If Only.../The Man with Rain in His Shoes/Twice Upon a Yesterday (1998) - Vendor
England, My England (1995) - Smith

References

English male soap opera actors
1951 births
Living people
Place of birth missing (living people)